The 2019 Delaware State Hornets football team represented Delaware State University in the 2019 NCAA Division I FCS football season. They were led by second-year head coach Rod Milstead and played their home games at Alumni Stadium. They were a member of the Mid-Eastern Athletic Conference (MEAC). They finished the season 2–10, 1–7 in MEAC play to finish in last place.

Previous season

The Hornets finished the 2018 season 3–8, 2–5 in MEAC play to finish in a tie for eighth place.

Preseason

MEAC poll
In the MEAC preseason poll released on July 26, 2019, the Hornets were predicted to finish in ninth place.

Preseason All–MEAC teams
The Hornets had eight players selected to the preseason all-MEAC teams.

First Team Offense

Kaiden Crawford – OL

Third Team Offense

Isiah Williams – TE

First Team Defense

Brian Cavicante – LB

Jahad Neibauer – DB

Second Team Defense

Christian Johnson – DL

Jose Romo-Martinez – K

Fidel Romo–Martinez – P

Third Team Defense

Devin Smith – DB

Schedule

Game summaries

at Delaware

Lincoln (PA)

Howard

at North Carolina A&T

South Carolina State

at Morgan State

Merrimack

at North Carolina Central

at Florida A&M

Bethune–Cookman

Norfolk State

Saint Francis (PA)

References

Delaware State
Delaware State Hornets football seasons
Delaware State Hornets football